José Francisco Molina Jiménez (born 8 August 1970) is a Spanish retired footballer who played as a goalkeeper.

Eleven years of his extensive professional career were spent at Atlético Madrid and Deportivo de La Coruña, where he won a total of five titles. Over 14 seasons, he appeared in 415 La Liga matches.

A Spain international for four years, Molina represented the nation at the 1998 World Cup and two European Championships.

Playing career

Club
Born in Valencia, Valencian Community, Molina started playing professionally with modest UD Alzira, being purchased in 1991 by local giants Valencia CF. After a loan stint with neighbours Villarreal CF he was sold to Albacete Balompié, making his La Liga debut on 8 January 1995 in a 1–0 home win against Real Oviedo. Even though he conceded eight goals in the last matchday, a home loss against Deportivo de La Coruña, his team managed to escape relegation in the playoffs.

Molina's career was intimately related with Atlético Madrid, of which he claimed to be a fan. Signing in 1995, he helped the capital side win a double (league and Copa del Rey) in his first year, going on to miss only two league matches in four seasons combined.

Joining 2000 league champions Deportivo La Coruña after Atlético's relegation, Molina helped win a Spanish cup and two supercups, being an undisputed starter throughout his stint in Galicia. However, on 14 October 2002, he announced that he suffered from testicular cancer, and that he was forced to undergo treatment for his illness, thus missing most of the 2002–03 campaign (ten league appearances, as Depor finished third); he eventually recovered fully.

After his link expired, Molina returned home to Valencia for 2006–07, playing for top-division strugglers Levante UD, but did not renew his contract after the season's end, retiring subsequently after the club retained its league status.

International
Molina made his Spanish national team debut as an outfield player against Norway on 24 April 1996 – a cameo appearance as a left winger, as all replacements had been made by coach Javier Clemente and Juan Manuel López retired injured.

He was then included in the squads for UEFA Euro 1996 and the 1998 FIFA World Cup, but had to wait until Euro 2000 for first-choice status, although he was dropped after a blunder in the opening 0–1 loss to Norway and did not play afterwards.

Coaching career
In the 2009–10 campaign, Molina started a coaching career with Villarreal C in Tercera División. On 12 May 2011, he replaced the fired Javi Gracia at the helm of the reserves in Segunda División as the team was seriously threatened with relegation.

Molina reached Villarreal's main squad on 22 December 2011, taking the place of sacked Juan Carlos Garrido. He was himself dismissed on 18 March of the following year after a 0–1 away loss against former club Levante, with the Yellow Submarine dangerously close to the relegation zone (17th).

In 2014, after leading Getafe CF B to the 14th place in Segunda División B, Molina was appointed at Hong Kong's Kitchee SC. In his only season he managed win the domestic treble, also taking the team to the quarter-finals of the AFC Cup.

On 3 May 2016, Molina was announced as the head coach of Indian Super League side ATK, replacing countryman Antonio López Habas. On 14 November of the following year, he was appointed at Ascenso MX club Atlético San Luis ahead of the Clausura tournament. He was relieved of his duties by the latter on 18 February 2018 after just two wins in 11 matches in all competitions, with his side in last position in the league.

In July 2018, Molina was appointed as sporting director of the Royal Spanish Football Federation, replacing Fernando Hierro who had resigned in the aftermath of Spain's performance at the 2018 FIFA World Cup. In December 2022, he left his position following a last-16 elimination at the 2022 World Cup at the hands of Morocco.

Honours

Player
Atlético Madrid
La Liga: 1995–96
Copa del Rey: 1995–96

Deportivo
Copa del Rey: 2001–02
Supercopa de España: 2000, 2002

Individual
Ricardo Zamora Trophy: 1995–96

Manager
Kitchee
Hong Kong Premier League: 2014–15
Hong Kong FA Cup: 2014–15
Hong Kong League Cup: 2014–15

Atlético Kolkata
Indian Super League: 2016

See also
List of Atlético Madrid players (+100)
List of La Liga players (400+ appearances)

References

External links

CiberChe biography and stats 

1970 births
Living people
Spanish footballers
Footballers from Valencia (city)
Association football goalkeepers
La Liga players
Segunda División players
Segunda División B players
Tercera División players
Valencia CF Mestalla footballers
UD Alzira footballers
Valencia CF players
Villarreal CF players
Albacete Balompié players
Atlético Madrid footballers
Deportivo de La Coruña players
Levante UD footballers
Spain international footballers
UEFA Euro 1996 players
1998 FIFA World Cup players
UEFA Euro 2000 players
Spanish football managers
La Liga managers
Segunda División managers
Segunda División B managers
Villarreal CF B managers
Villarreal CF managers
Kitchee SC managers
Indian Super League head coaches
ATK (football club) head coaches
Spanish expatriate football managers
Expatriate football managers in Hong Kong
Expatriate football managers in India
Expatriate football managers in Mexico
Spanish expatriate sportspeople in Hong Kong
Spanish expatriate sportspeople in India
Spanish expatriate sportspeople in Mexico